Ajatshatru Singh (born 6 February 1966) is an Indian politician and a member of the Bharatiya Janata Party. He is a former member of Jammu and Kashmir Legislative Council in the Government of Jammu and Kashmir. He was a member of the Jammu & Kashmir National Conference and was minister of state with portfolios of Tourism, Youth Services & Sports, Parks and Gardens, Science & Technology and Transport & Information in Farooq Abdullah's government from 1996 to 2002. He was also Member of Legislative Assembly from Nagrota constituency from 1996 to 2002.

He is a younger brother of senior Congress leader Vikramaditya Singh and son of former Sadr-e-Riyasat Karan Singh and Yasho Rajya Lakshmi, granddaughter of the last Rana Prime Minister of Nepal, Mohan Shumsher Jang Bahadur Rana. He is also Trustee of J&K Dharmarth Trust which was founded by Maharaja Gulab Singh. His elder brother Vikramaditya Singh is a member of the Indian National Congress.

In November 2015, he joined the Bharatiya Janata Party in presence of party's President Amit Shah.

References

Jammu & Kashmir National Conference politicians
1964 births
Living people
Members of the Jammu and Kashmir Legislative Council
People from Jammu and Kashmir
Kashmiri people
Jammu and Kashmir MLAs 1996–2002
State cabinet ministers of Jammu and Kashmir
Bharatiya Janata Party politicians from Jammu and Kashmir